John Maxwell Ferren (born July 21, 1937) is a Senior associate judge of the District of Columbia Court of Appeals. He served as an associate judge on the court from 1977 to 1997, left to serve as corporation counsel for the District of Columbia for two years, and returned to serve as a senior judge.

Biography 
Ferren was raised in the Kansas City area and in Evanston, Illinois, where he graduated from Evanston Township High School in 1955. After obtaining bachelor's and law degrees from Harvard University, he took a job in Chicago at Kirkland, Ellis, Hodson, Chaffetz & Masters. While in Chicago he helped organize volunteer legal services for the indigent as part of an organization that became Chicago Volunteer Legal Services. In 1966, Ferren returned to Harvard Law School to establish and direct a new federally funded neighborhood law office serving low-income clients. In 1970, he moved to Washington, D.C., where Hogan & Hartson hired him to lead their new Community Services Department, the first practice group at a major law firm devoted exclusively to pro bono legal services. During his seven years leading the department, Ferren represented members of the Black Panther Party against the Metropolitan Police Department of the District of Columbia and challenged the Nixon administration's attempts to dismantle federal poverty programs.

In 1977, Ferren was nominated by President Carter to the D.C. Court of Appeals and confirmed by the Senate. He acquired a reputation as a liberal judge and was respected even by government lawyers and prosecutors whom he often ruled against. In 1997, he left the bench to become the District's corporation counsel, a role in which he attempted to defend D.C.'s autonomy against the federally imposed District of Columbia Financial Control Board. After stepping down in 1999, he rejoined the court as a senior judge and completed work on his book, Salt of the Earth, Conscience of the Court: The Story of Justice Wiley Rutledge, which was published by the University of North Carolina Press in 2004 and won several awards.

References

Sources 
 
 The Lawyer at Center Stage; D.C. Corporation Counsel John Ferren Hopes to Direct the City's Comeback, Washington Post, January 21, 1998

1937 births
Living people
20th-century American judges
District of Columbia Attorneys General
Harvard Law School alumni
Judges of the District of Columbia Court of Appeals
Lawyers from Washington, D.C.
People associated with Hogan Lovells
People associated with Kirkland & Ellis
United States Article I federal judges appointed by Jimmy Carter